Straight, No Chaser is an album by jazz saxophonist Joe Henderson released on the Verve label.  It was recorded on April 21, 1968 and featuring a live performance by Henderson with pianist Wynton Kelly, bassist Paul Chambers and drummer Jimmy Cobb. The recording was not released until 1996. The Allmusic review by Scott Yanow states: "Although Henderson had not played with the other musicians before, they blend together quite well and obviously inspired each other". Further selections from this concert were released as Four.

Track listing
 "Straight, No Chaser" (Monk) – 14:40  
 "Days of Wine and Roses" (Mancini, Mercer) – 8:19  
 "What Is This Thing Called Love?" (Porter) – 9:28  
 "If You Could See Me Now" (Dameron, Sigman) – 8:39  
 "On a Clear Day (You Can See Forever)" (Lerner, Lane) – 11:51  
 "Limehouse Blues" (Braham, Furber) – 6:37  
 "Pfrancing" (Davis) – 9:02  
 "The Theme" (Davis) – 2:13

Personnel
Joe Henderson –  tenor saxophone
Wynton Kelly –  piano
Paul Chambers –  bass
Jimmy Cobb –  drums

References

Joe Henderson live albums
1968 live albums
Verve Records live albums